The Million Book Project (or the Universal Library) was a book digitization project led by Carnegie Mellon University School of Computer Science and University Libraries from 2007–2008. Working with government and research partners in India (Digital Library of India) and China, the project scanned books in many languages, using OCR to enable full text searching, and providing free-to-read access to the books on the web. , they have completed the scanning of 1 million books and have made the entire catalog accessible online.

Description
The Million Book Project was a 501(c)3 charity organization with various scanning centers throughout the world.

By December 2007, more than 1.5 million books had been scanned, in 20 languages: 970,000 in Chinese; 360,000 in English; 50,000 in Telugu; and 40,000 in Arabic. Most of the books are in the public domain, but permission has been acquired to include over 60,000 copyrighted books (roughly 53,000 in English and 7,000 in Indian languages). The books are mirrored in part at sites in India, China, Carnegie Mellon, the Internet Archive, Bibliotheca Alexandrina. The books that have been scanned to date are not yet all available online, and no single site has copies of all the books that are available online.

The million book project was a "proof of concept" that has largely been replaced by HathiTrust, Google Book Search and the Internet Archive book scanning projects.

The Internet Archive may have some books that Google does not (e.g.: The Poems of Robert Frost published after the end of 1922).

The National Science Foundation (NSF) awarded Carnegie Mellon $3.63M over four years for equipment and administrative travel for the Million Book Project. India provided $25M annually to support language translation research projects. The Ministry of Education in China provided $8.46M over three years. The Internet Archive provided equipment, staff and money. The University of California, Merced Library funded the work to acquire copyright permission from U.S. publishers.

The program ended in 2008.

Partner institutions

China
The institutions in China which are participants in this project include:
 Ministry of Education of the People's Republic of China
 Chinese Academy of Science
 Fudan University
 Nanjing University
 Peking University
 Tsinghua University
 Zhejiang University
 Northeast Normal University

India
The institutions in India which are participants in this project include:
 Indian Institute of Science, Bangalore
 International Institute of Information Technology, Hyderabad
 Indian Institute of Information Technology, Allahabad
 Anna University, Chennai
 Mysore University, Mysore
 University of Pune, Pune
 Goa University, Goa
 Tirumala Tirupati Devasthanams, Tirupathi
 Shanmugha Arts, Science, Technology & Research Academy, Tanjore
 Kalasalingam Academy of Research and Education, Srivilliputhur
 Maharashtra Industrial Development Corporation, Mumbai

United States
The institutions in the U.S. which are participants include:
 Internet Archive
 Indiana University
 Pennsylvania State University
 Stanford University
TriColleges (Swarthmore, Haverford, Bryn Mawr)
 University of California, Berkeley
 University of California, Merced
 University of Pittsburgh
 University of Washington

Europe
The institutions in the EU which are participants include:
 Copenhagen University
 Aarhus University
 Odense University
 Denmark Virtual Library

See also
 Book scanning
 Digital library (list)
 Digital preservation
 Universal library
 Project Gutenberg

References

External links
 The Universal Digital Library
 The Million Book Digital Library Project (paper from December 1, 2001)
 Frequently Asked Questions
 Universal Library, China site
 Universal Digital Library at Allahabad
 Digital Library of India
 Internet Archive:
 the archived pilot
 larger partial collection

Carnegie Mellon University
Ebook suppliers
Mass digitization
Digital library projects